Here are the nominees and winners of the Black Reel Award for Best Director: Television Movie/Cable. The category was reinstated in 2013 after a five-year hiatus.

Winners and nominees

References

Black Reel Awards